Conus scopulorum is a species of sea snail, a marine gastropod mollusk in the family Conidae, the cone snails and their allies.

Like all species within the genus Conus, these snails are predatory and venomous. They are capable of "stinging" humans, therefore live ones should be handled carefully or not at all.

Distribution
This species occurs in the Atlantic Ocean off Brasil.

Description 
The maximum recorded shell length is 26.5 mm.

Habitat 
Minimum recorded depth is 47 m. Maximum recorded depth is 120 m.

References

 Van Mol, J. J., B. Tursch and M. Kempf. 1971. Further notes on Brazilian Conidae. Zoologische Mededelingen 45: 161–166, pl. 1
 Tucker J.K. & Tenorio M.J. (2009) Systematic classification of Recent and fossil conoidean gastropods. Hackenheim: Conchbooks. 296 pp.
  Puillandre N., Duda T.F., Meyer C., Olivera B.M. & Bouchet P. (2015). One, four or 100 genera? A new classification of the cone snails. Journal of Molluscan Studies. 81: 1–23

External links
 The Conus Biodiversity website
 

scopulorum
Gastropods described in 1971